Audnedalen is the shortest of the six main north-south valleys in Agder county, Norway. The river Audna runs through the valley, ending in Snigsfjorden in the south. The valley floor is flat and the sides are relatively steep. Since it is a rather short valley, it does not reach into the high moorland like other such valleys in the county.

References

Valleys of Agder
Audnedal
Lindesnes